Leonora Demaj (born 25 August 1997) is a Danish-Kosovan handball player for Vendsyssel Håndbold and the Kosovan national team.

Referencer 

1997 births
Living people
Kosovan female handball players
Leonora Demaj
Handball players from Copenhagen